Thota Ravi Krishna is an Indian television actor and director. He predominantly works in Telugu television series and shows. He is known for Mogali Rekulu (2008-2013), Varudhini Parinayam (2013-2016) and Aame Katha (2019-2021).

Early life 
Ravikrishna was born in Vijayawada. After completing his degree, he went to Chennai with an interest in acting and joined as an Assistant Director.

Career 
He started his career as an assistant director in Vijetha of ETV and later came to Hyderabad and worked as an assistant director again. Then as a replacement hero at the end of the serial called Bommarillu, he was selected as the lead actor for which he was already working as the assistant director. He then acted in a few independent films.

After a long break, he was selected in the auditions and acted in the popular drama series Mogali Rekulu. Then he starred in some Telugu series but became known with the soap opera Varudhini Parinayam and later became well known in the series That Is Mahalakshmi, Srinivasa Kalyanam, Sundarakanda, Bava Maradallu. 

He is currently acting in Aame Katha which is airing successfully. In 2020, he was affected with Coronavirus disease.

Filmography

Television

See also 

 List of Indian television actors
 Lists of Indian actors

References

External links 

 

Male actors in Telugu television
Telugu male actors
Male actors from Vijayawada
Male actors from Andhra Pradesh
Year of birth missing (living people)
Living people
People from Vijayawada
People from Krishna district
Indian male actors
Indian television actors
Indian male television actors
Bigg Boss (Telugu TV series) contestants
Indian male film actors
Male actors in Telugu cinema
21st-century Indian male actors